Paul Reed Smith (born February 18, 1956) is an American luthier and the founder and owner of PRS Guitars, a high-end guitar maker.

Early life
Smith graduated from Bowie High School in 1974. He also attended St. Mary's College of Maryland where he began his guitar-making career. He subsequently left the college.

Mentorship under Ted McCarty

Smith contacted Ted McCarty, former president of Gibson and creator of the Explorer, ES-335, and Flying V guitars, and McCarty became his mentor and advisor. The result of their collaboration was the current line of PRS Guitars, which include solid and hollow-body guitars. The Private Stock line of PRS guitars are made utilizing a range of exotic materials including various stones, elaborately figured tonewoods, and intricate shells for inlays.

References

American luthiers
Businesspeople from Maryland
People from Bowie, Maryland
1956 births
Living people
St. Mary's College of Maryland alumni
People from Stevensville, Maryland